Alvord Lake is a lake in Lincoln County of the U.S. state of Montana.

References 

Lakes of Montana
Bodies of water of Lincoln County, Montana